Temple Sinai was an egalitarian, Reform synagogue established in Portsmouth, Virginia, in December 1953. The congregation, which was located at 4401 Hatton Point Road, was called A Family of Traditional and Non-Traditional Families and was a member of the Union for Reform Judaism. The congregation was headed by Rabbi Arthur Z. Steinberg, of blessed memory. Temple Sinai celebrated its 50th anniversary in 2004. Temple Sinai merged with Norfolk's Ohef Sholom Temple in June 2012.

History
Temple Sinai was founded on December 2, 1953, during the Jewish festival of Hanukkah. Its seven sponsoring members agreed on the congregation's name within a few days and held their first religious service at the Portsmouth Women's Club on January 8, 1954. Until the construction of its building, services were also held at the Portsmouth Coca-Cola Bottling Works and the Suburban Country Club. The cornerstone for the building on its  site on Hatton Point Road was laid in 1956. Temple Sinai marked its fiftieth anniversary in June 2004.

Portsmouth United Religious School
Temple Sinai and Gomley Chesed, a nearby synagogue also located in Portsmouth, have formed a combined religious school program, Portsmouth United Religious School.  The Portsmouth United Religious School, also known as "Portsmouth Religious School" and by the acronym "PURS", is a family education program and outreach for the total Jewish community.

Activities
Temple Sinai emphasized religious education and service to the community through social action.

Temple Sinai helped provide food for the hungry and shelter for the homeless. As the only Jewish congregation among fifty congregations of the Portsmouth Volunteers for the Homeless, Temple Sinai distinguished itself by opening its doors for fifty to sixty homeless people during Christmas week, so that their Christian partners can be at home with their families during this season. In this work it was also affiliated with MAZON's "3% Circle", in which 3% of the cost of the temple's holiday dinners and lifecycle celebrations were donated to MAZON.

Temple Sinai engaged in pulpit exchanges with Gomley Chesed and with Ohef Sholom Temple of Norfolk, Virginia. A pulpit exchange involves a visit of one congregation to the other congregation's facility for a special combined service.

Notes

Bibliography 
  Paywall.

External links
  Temple Sinai's website
 The Scribe, Temple Sinai's newsletter

Reform synagogues in Virginia
Jewish organizations established in 1953
Portsmouth, Virginia
1953 establishments in Virginia
Synagogues completed in 1957